Sabine Erbs (born 17 July 1964) is a German handball player who played for the West German national team. She was born in Berlin. She represented West Germany at the 1984 Summer Olympics in Los Angeles, where the West German team placed fourth.

References

External links

1964 births
Living people
Handball players from Berlin
German female handball players
Olympic handball players of West Germany
Handball players at the 1984 Summer Olympics